Constantinople is the historic city name of present-day Istanbul in Turkey, formerly known as Byzantium.

Constantinople may also refer to:

 Constantinople (ensemble)
 Constantinople (novel), alternative name for Aziyadé
 Constantinople (Amicis book), name of an 1877 travel book by Edmondo de Amicis
 Constantinople: City of the World's Desire 1453-1924, a 1996 book by Phillip Mansel
 "Constantinople" (song), titled "Istanbul (Not Constantinople)", a song by the Four Lads, with a popular cover by They Might Be Giants
 "Constantinople", a song by the Decemberists from their EP Picaresqueties
 "Constantinople", a song by The Residents
 Constantinople Records
 Dufrais Constantinople, a character in the British sketch show Fonejacker and its spin-off Facejacker
 Church of Constantinople
 Ecumenical Patriarch of Constantinople

See also

 
 Byzantium (disambiguation)
 Constantine (disambiguation)
 Istanbul (disambiguation)
 Names of Istanbul
 New Rome (disambiguation)
 Nova Roma (disambiguation)
 Second Rome (disambiguation)